This is a list of bridges and other crossings of the Snake River, from the Columbia River upstream to its sources. Headwaters of the North Fork are at Big Springs near Island Park, Idaho, while Jackson Lake is at the head of the South Fork. These two forks of the Snake River come together at the base of the Menan Buttes.

Crossings

See also

References

Crossings
Crossings
Snake River
Snake River
Snake